Ušće may refer to:

 Ušće, Belgrade, a settlement in Belgrade, Serbia
 Ušće (Obrenovac), a village in the municipality of Obrenovac, city of Belgrade, Serbia
 Ušće (Kraljevo), a village in the municipality of Kraljevo, Serbia

or:
 Ušće Tower, a building in Ušće, Belgrade, Serbia